Dionisio Boldo  (active 1604) was an Italian painter of the Baroque period, mainly active in Brescia. He trained with Giulio Clovio. He specialized in painting miniature watercolor paintings. He also worked as an architect for the church of San Petronio in Bologna.

References

17th-century Italian painters
Italian male painters
Painters from Brescia
Italian Baroque painters
Year of death unknown
Year of birth unknown